C53 or C-53 may refer to:
 , an Admirable-class minesweeper of the Mexican Navy
 Caldwell 53, a lenticular galaxy
 CDK5RAP3, a gene encoding CDK5 regulatory subunit-associated protein 3
 Cervical cancer
 Douglas C-53 Skytrooper, an American military aircraft
 GER Class C53, a British tram engine class
 , a Minotaur-class light cruiser of the Royal Canadian Navy
 JNR Class C53, a Japanese steam locomotive
 Succession to the Throne Act, 2013, Bill C-53 of the Parliament of Canada